The 2008 New Zealand rugby union tour was a series of matches played in Hong Kong, United Kingdom and Ireland in November 2008, by New Zealand national rugby union team.

The All Blacks obtained their third Grand Slam after the 1978 tour and 2005 New Zealand rugby union tour of Britain and Ireland.

The tour opened with a match against Australia in Hong Kong, valid for Bledisloe Cup.

Bledisloe Cup 
A First match was played in Hong Kong against Australia. It was the fourth match between the two teams. Winning the match, the All Blacks, tied the series (2–2) valid also for Bledisloe Cup, holding the title.

Grand Slam

Scotland 
The first test gave All Blacks an easy victory, with Richie McCaw and Dan Carter on the bench of reserves.

Ireland 
Also again Ireland, the All Blacks obtain a good victory, but the first half (close 10–3) was not easy, and the All Blacks lead the match only thanks a penalty try in the last minute of the half.

Munster

Wales

England 

2008 rugby union tours
2008 in New Zealand rugby union
2008
2008
2008–09 in European rugby union
2008–09 in Scottish rugby union
2008–09 in Irish rugby union
2008–09 in Welsh rugby union
2008–09 in English rugby union
2008
2008
2008
2008
2008 in Australian rugby union